Roman Gavalier (born May 30, 1971) is a Slovak former ice hockey defenceman.

Gavalier joined the Belfast Giants in 2004, joining from his hometown HK Aquacity ŠKP Poprad, scoring 4 goals and 8 assists for 12 points in 55 games. After spending a year in Poland for Unia Oświęcim, Gavalier signed up to return to Belfast for the 2006-07 Elite League season. His performances throughout the season earned him the Kingdom of the Giants Most Valuable Player Award, an award won the previous season by former NHL superstar Theo Fleury. Gavalier's contract was not renewed after the 2007-08 season and Gavalier returned to Slovakia with MHK Kežmarok where he ended his playing career.

External links
 

1971 births
Living people
Belfast Giants players
HK Poprad players
HK Spišská Nová Ves players
MHK Kežmarok players
Sportspeople from Poprad
Slovak ice hockey defencemen
TH Unia Oświęcim players
Expatriate ice hockey players in Northern Ireland
Slovak expatriate ice hockey people
Czechoslovak ice hockey defencemen
Slovak expatriate sportspeople in Northern Ireland
Slovak expatriate sportspeople in Poland
Expatriate ice hockey players in Poland